Daoming (道明) was a Chinese Buddhist monk and the left attendant of the bodhisattva Kṣitigarbha. His father also entered the way of the bodhisattva and became his disciple and the right attendant, Mingong.

Legends
The name "Daoming" was fairly common, and surviving sources contain biographies of over a dozen Buddhist monks with this name. The recurrence of the name among Buddhist monks was acknowledged in the Record of a Returned Soul that explains how the underworld authorities mistook Daoming of Kaishan Monastery for Daoming of Longxing Monastery for a discussion of the various Daomings' related death and afterlife.

According to the "Record of a Returned Soul", Daoming, a monk who lived in the Kaishan Monastery in Xiang, was summoned to hell by mistake in 778 AD. Before he returned back to Earth, he saw a monk who announced that he was Kșitigarbha. Kșitigarbha asked him to propagate throughout the world his true image – that is to say, with the head-dress.

According to the local tradition, Daoming was the son of Mingong, a wealthy man and landowner of the Mount Jiuhua. Mingong donated all peaks of his mountain to monk Dizang for use as a place of worship where dharma was taught. He even asked his son to accompany Dizang to become a Buddhist monk who was also subsequently called Daoming.  His father also became a follower of Dizang. Soon after that, he became enlightened.

References

Chinese deities
Chinese Buddhist monks